Megachile leonum is a species of bee in the family Megachilidae. It was described by Theodore Dru Alison Cockerell in 1930.

References

Leonum
Insects described in 1930